Queens of the Stone Age is an American rock band formed in 1996 in Palm Desert, California. The band's line-up includes founder Josh Homme (lead vocals, guitar, piano), alongside longtime members Troy Van Leeuwen (guitar, lap steel, keyboard, percussion, backing vocals), Michael Shuman (bass guitar, keyboard, backing vocals), Dean Fertita (keyboards, guitar, percussion, backing vocals), and recent addition Jon Theodore (drums, percussion). Formed after the dissolution of Homme's previous band, Kyuss, Queens of the Stone Age developed a style of riff-oriented, heavy rock music. Their sound has since evolved to incorporate a variety of different styles and influences, including working with ZZ Top member Billy Gibbons, Nirvana drummer and Foo Fighters frontman Dave Grohl, and steady contributor Mark Lanegan.

Songs

Notes

References 

Queens of the Stone Age
Queens of the Stone Age songs